Siluck Saysanasy (born January 30, 1974) is a Laotian-Canadian television actor.

Saysanasy is best known for playing "Yick Yu", a character from the Degrassi series. He went to high school at Vaughan Road Academy in Toronto, Ontario, in the Interact program.

One of his real-life best friends is Pat Mastroianni, who played Joey Jeremiah on Degrassi.

Since 2002, Saysanasy has worked as an assistant director on shows such as Degrassi: The Next Generation, The Strain, Designated Survivor, and Shadowhunters.

Acting filmography 

 Cagney & Lacey: True Convictions (1996) (TV) .... Delivery Guy
 School's Out (1992) (TV) .... Yick Yu
 Degrassi Junior High (1986) TV Series .... Yick Yu
 The Peanut Butter Solution (1985).... Connie
 Degrassi Talks (1992).... Himself
 Degrassi High  (1989) TV Series.... Yick Yu
 Degrassi: The Next Generation (2001) TV Series.... Yick Yu

References

External links

Interview with Degrassi.ca
Siluck Saysanasy: His Story

1974 births
Living people
Canadian male child actors
Canadian people of Laotian descent
Laotian male actors
Laotian emigrants to Canada
Male actors from Toronto
People from Vientiane
Canadian male television actors
20th-century Canadian male actors